123 Squadron is a squadron of the Israeli Air Force also known as  Desert Birds Squadron  (formerly Southern Bells Squadron).

123 Squadron is a helicopter squadron of S-70A Black Hawks based at Palmachim Airbase.

References

Israeli Air Force squadrons